Atla Tadde is a traditional festival celebrated by both unmarried and married Hindu women of Andhra Pradesh for getting a husband or for the health and long life of their husbands. It occurs on the 3rd night after the full moon in Aswiyuja month of Telugu calendar, and falls in either September or October in the Gregorian calendar. 
It is the Telugu equivalent of Karva Chauth, which is celebrated by north Indian women the following day.

The Ritual
Telugu women commemorate Atla Tadde by fasting for a day without food or water. Women perform pooja in the evening and break their fast by eating small Atlu (dosas) after gazing at the moon.

Following are customs in some places of Andhra Pradesh, India:
 This festival is celebrated by women and children.
 On eve of this day, they apply Gorintaku (henna) on their palms.
 Women and children wake up in the early morning before the sunrise, and have suddi (rice cooked day before night) with perugu (curd) and Gongura chutney.
 Unmarried girls and children will play on the streets singing Atla Tadde Song after having suddi until sun raises.
 People swing in the Uyyala (Swing (seat)).
 People watch the moon in nearby pond or lake after the sunrise welcoming the day.
Pootarekulu (sweet made with rice flour, jaggery, and milk)
 Kudumulu (5 for gauri devi) (for yourself and other muttayuduvu 5 each and on 4 kudumulu you place one on top of the 4 and make it as deepam and eat the same after your pooja when the deepam is still lighting)
 11 small Dosas (for each)
 Toranam for hand (with 11 knots for atla tadde n 5 knots toranam for Undralla tadde)

On this day, Some have a custom of preparing atlu and keep those as offering to goddess Gowri, and after they will be distributed to relatives, neighbors as vaayanam. For each muttayduvu (these ladies/relatives fast along with the one who is having this pooja perform). The ceremony includes 11 ladies who already took this vayanam and if your menatta (dad's sister) took this vayanam the rituals continues. To all these 11 ladies you give each 11 atlu with deepam (made of rice flour and ghee and lit in front of goddess Gowri) you offer each lady the vayanam by holding with your sarees palluor kongu... you utter these words
...istinamma vanayam (i gave her the vayanam)
...puchukunna amma vayanam (lady says: i took the vayanam)
...mummatiki ichindamma vayanam (or) andinchinamma vayanam (i gave her the vayanam)
...mummatiki muttindamma vayanam (or) andindamma vayanam (lady says: i received the vayanam)
...vayanam puchukunna vanita evaro (you ask/pose a question saying who took the vayanam)
...ne ne namma gowri parvati (lady says: she says its me GowriParvathi)
and they then break the fast along with you by having all the dishes made and some also make sweet called temanam (made with milk and rice powder)and  take home those atlu and eat later with family members.

Pooja ceremony:
 Prepare kalasham on rice, coins (inside kalasam water, kumkum, turmeric, coin, and flower with 5 mango leaves or just water)
 Make pasupu ganapathi
 Gauri ashtotram
 Lalitha harathi/gauri harathi
 Story

People sing folk songs like atla taddi aaratloi, mudda pappu mudatloi,....

References

Hindu festivals
Festivals in Andhra Pradesh
Religious festivals in India
Folk festivals in India